Lou Tellegen (born Isidor Louis Bernard Edmon van Dommelen; November 26, 1881 or 1883 – October 29, 1934) was a Dutch-born stage and film actor, film director and screenwriter.

Early life
Tellegen was the illegitimate child of a separated, but not divorced, lieutenant of the West-Indian Army Isidore Louis Bernard Edmon Tellegen (1836–1902) and his partner Anna Maria van Dommelen (1844–1917), widow of Eduard Hendrik Jan Storm van 's Gravezande.

He made his stage debut in Amsterdam in 1903, and over the next few years built a reputation to the point where he was invited to perform in Paris, eventually co-starring in several roles with Sarah Bernhardt, with whom he was involved romantically. In 1910, he made his motion picture debut alongside Bernhardt in La dame aux camélias, a silent film made in France based on the play by Alexandre Dumas, fils.

Career

In 1910, he and Bernhardt travelled to the United States, where The New York Times first published, and then retracted, the announcement of their impending marriage. (She was 37 years his senior.) Back in France, in 1912 they made their second film together, Les Amours de la reine Élisabeth (Queen Elizabeth), and the following year, Adrienne Lecouvreur. The latter is considered a lost film.

In the summer of 1913, Tellegen went to London where he produced and starred in a play based on Oscar Wilde's novel The Picture of Dorian Gray. Invited back to the United States, Tellegen worked in theatre and made his first American film in 1915, titled The Explorer, followed by The Unknown, both with Dorothy Davenport as his co-star. Considered one of the best-looking actors on screen, he followed up with three straight films starring with Geraldine Farrar.

Tellegen's marriage to Farrar ended in divorce in 1923. Tellegen married a total of four times, the first to a sculptress in 1903 (this union produced a daughter), the second to Farrar in 1916. His third marriage was to actress Nina Romano (real name: Isabel Craven Dilworth), with whom he had a son. His fourth marriage was to silent film star Eve Casanova (real name Julia Horne). He became an American citizen in 1918.

Later career and death
On Christmas Day 1929, Tellegen sustained burns to his face when he fell asleep while smoking. At the time, he was preparing for an out-of-town tryout for a play. To repair the damage, Tellegen underwent extensive plastic surgery. In 1931, he wrote his autobiography Women Have Been Kind.

By 1931, Tellegen’s popularity had declined and he had trouble securing acting work. He was also deeply in debt and filed for bankruptcy. Around this time, Tellegen was diagnosed with cancer though this information was kept from him. Tellegen soon grew despondent.

On October 29, 1934, while a guest of Edna Cudahy, the widow of meat packing heir Jack Cudahy, at the Cudahy Mansion at 1844 North Vine Street in Hollywood (now the site of the Vine-Franklin underpass of the Hollywood Freeway), Tellegen locked himself in the bathroom, then shaved and powdered his face. While standing in front of a full-length mirror, he stabbed himself in the heart seven times with a pair of sewing scissors. Some accounts claim Tellegen was surrounded by newspaper clippings of his career at the time of his suicide.

When asked to comment on Tellegen's death, former wife Geraldine Farrar replied "Why should that interest me?" Tellegen was cremated and his remains scattered at sea.

Filmography

Footnotes

References
 Arthur Gold and Robert Fizdale, The Divine Sarah (New York: Vintage Books, 1991.) 
 David W. Menefee, The Rise and Fall of Lou-Tellegen (Menefee Publishing, Inc, 2011).

External links

 
 

1880s births
1934 suicides
American male film actors
American theatre directors
American male screenwriters
American male silent film actors
Dutch emigrants to the United States
Dutch male film actors
Dutch male silent film actors
Dutch male stage actors
People from Sint-Oedenrode
Silent film directors
Suicides by sharp instrument in the United States
Suicides in California
Vaudeville performers
20th-century American male actors
20th-century American male writers
20th-century American screenwriters
1934 deaths